Tingokkyi may refer to several places in Burma:

Tingokkyi, Sagaing
Tingokkyi, Magway